Alma Cuervo (born August 13, 1951 in Tampa, Florida) is an American stage actress and singer, who has also performed in film and television. She holds an M.F.A. in acting from the Yale School of Drama, from which she graduated in 1976 alongside Meryl Streep.

Career 

She starred in the role of Madame Morrible in the first national tour of Wicked. She replaced Carole Shelley on March 8, 2006. She left the role on January 14, 2007, to star in the first national tour of My Fair Lady. She was replaced by Barbara Tirrell. After My Fair Lady, she returned to the tour of Wicked from November 14, 2007, through July 14, 2008, and was replaced by Myra Lucretia Taylor. In 2011, she originated the role of Hilary in Susan Charlotte's The Shoemaker, directed by Antony Marsellis and co-starring Danny Aiello and Lucy Devito. In 2015, she originated the role of Gloria Estefan's grandmother, Consuelo, in the Broadway musical On Your Feet! Other theater credits include Beauty and the Beast, Cabaret, Dancing at Lughnasa, Once in a Lifetime and as Isa Straus in the Tony Award-winning musical, Titanic (original cast). She also played Cinderella’s Stepmother/Granny/Giant’s Wife in Into the Woods in a 25th anniversary co-production between Baltimore's Center Stage and Westport Country Playhouse.

Stage credits

Broadway credits

References

External links
 
 

1951 births
Living people
American film actresses
American stage actresses
American musical theatre actresses
American television actresses
Actresses from Tampa, Florida
Yale School of Drama alumni
21st-century American women